Streptomyces coelicoflavus is a bacterium species from the genus of Streptomyces. Streptomyces coelicoflavus produces acarviosin-containing oligosaccharides.

See also 
 List of Streptomyces species

References

Further reading

External links
Type strain of Streptomyces coelicoflavus at BacDive -  the Bacterial Diversity Metadatabase

coelicoflavus
Bacteria described in 1986